Iain Fullarton (born 25 April 1976) is a former Scottish rugby union player. His regular playing position was Lock.

Club career
Fullarton was educated at St. Mary's School, Melrose, Merchiston Castle School and the University of Aberdeen.  While at Merchiston Castle School he appeared for the Scottish schools side.  Fullarton turned professional with Edinburgh Reivers and has since played for Sale Sharks. He signed for Saracens in 2004.  In June 2008 he signed a two-year deal to play for London Scottish.

International career
Fullarton represented Scotland at under 21, under 19 and under 18 levels and made 15 appearances for the Scotland A side. He made his full Scotland debut in their tour of New Zealand in 2000, replacing Scott Murray in the first Test against New Zealand, and was subsequently selected in the starting line up for the second test. He won his third cap, again as a replacement for Scott Murray in the November 2001 Test, also against New Zealand. He won his fifth cap for Scotland when he came on as a substitute in the 2003 Rugby World Cup countdown Test against Ireland in 2003. Earlier that summer he toured South Africa with Scotland but did not play in either Test match.  Overall he won eight international caps.  In 2009 Fullarton represented the Barbarians.

References

External links
Iain Fullarton at ESPNscrum

1976 births
Living people
People educated at St. Mary's School, Melrose
People educated at Merchiston Castle School
Alumni of the University of Aberdeen
Dundee HSFP players
Edinburgh Rugby players
Sale Sharks players
Saracens F.C. players
London Scottish F.C. players
Scottish rugby union players
Scotland international rugby union players
Barbarian F.C. players
Rugby union locks